Daniel Antonio Reyes Torres (born 5 May 1972) is a Colombian former professional boxer who competed from 1996 to 2009. He held the IBF minimumweight title from 2003 to 2004. As an amateur, he competed at the 1996 Summer Olympics.

Amateur career

Reyes represented Colombia as a Flyweight at the 1996 Olympic Games in Atlanta. His results were:
Defeated Tebebu Behonebn (Ethiopia) 16-2
Defeated Khaled Falah (Syria) 15-13
Lost to Albert Pakeyev (Russia) 13-13

Professional career

Reyes turned professional in 1996 and won the IBF World Strawweight Championship by a TKO over Edgar Cardenas in 2003. He lost his belt in 2004 by split decision to Muhammad Rachman.

References

External links
 

1972 births
Living people
Mini-flyweight boxers
World mini-flyweight boxing champions
International Boxing Federation champions
Boxers at the 1995 Pan American Games
Boxers at the 1996 Summer Olympics
Olympic boxers of Colombia
Pan American Games competitors for Colombia
Colombian male boxers
People from Caquetá Department
20th-century Colombian people